This page lists the winners and nominees for the Soul Train Music Award for Video of the Year. Originally entitled Best Music Video, the award has been retitled a further two times, including to The Michael Jackson Award for Best R&B/Soul or Rap Music Video before being retitled again to its current title in 2013. Janet Jackson has won this award a record six times and Beyoncé is the only artist with multiple nominations in one year.

Winners and nominees
Winners are listed first and highlighted in bold.

1980s

1990s

2000s

2010s

2020s

References

Soul Train Music Awards
American music video awards